Quṭb-ud-Dīn Aḥmad Walīullāh Ibn ʿAbd-ur-Raḥīm Ibn Wajīh-ud-Dīn Ibn Muʿaẓẓam Ibn Manṣūr Al-ʿUmarī Ad-Dehlawī (‎; 1703–1762), commonly known as Shāh Walīullāh Dehlawī (also Shah Wali Allah), was an Islamic scholar seen by his followers as a renewer. Shah Waliullah visited Makkah at the age of 29 years( 1732 AD ).

Early life
Shah Waliullah was born on 21 February 1703 to Shah Abdur Rahim, a prominent Islamic scholar of Delhi. He was known as Shah Waliullah because of his piety. He memorized the Qur'an by the age of seven. Soon thereafter, he mastered Arabic and Persian letters. He was married at fourteen. By sixteen he had completed the standard curriculum of Hanafi law, theology, geometry, arithmetic and logic.

His father, Shah Abdur Rahim was the founder of the Madrasah-i Rahimiyah. He was on the committee appointed by Aurangzeb for compilation of the code of law, Fatawa-e-Alamgiri.

Death
He died on Friday the 29th of Muharram 1176 AH/ 20 August 1762 at Zuhr prayer in Old Delhi, aged 59. He was buried beside his father Shah Abdur Rahim at Mehdiyan (a graveyard to the left of Delhi Gate).

Views

On Sunni Islam 

Shah Waliullah defined Sunni Islam in broad terms, rather than confining it to a specific school of theology. According to Shah, Ahlul Sunna wal Jam'ah are those who followed the Qur'an and Sunnah on the way of the Sahaba (companions) and Tabi'un, by holding "fast to the beliefs of the pious ancestors (al-salaf)." He considered the four legal schools, as well as both the Ahl al-Hadith and Ahl al-Ra'y (Ash'ari and Maturidi) schools of theology to be part of Sunnism. According to Shah, the differences between them are only over secondary issues of valid Ikhtilaf; while on fundamental issues they remain united.

On Shari'a (Islamic law) 
Shah Waliullah criticized those people who downplayed the necessity of following Sharia (Islamic law). "Some people think that there is no usefulness involved in the injunct of Islamic law and that in actions and rewards as prescribed by God there is no beneficial purpose. They think that the commandments of Islamic law are similar to a master ordering his servant to lift a stone or touch a tree in order to test his obedience and that in this there is no purpose except to impose a test so that if the servant obeys, he is rewarded, and if he disobeys, he is punished. This view is completely incorrect. The traditions of the Prophet and consensus of opinion of those ages, contradict this view".

On Fiqh (Jurisprudence) 
In his work Tahfimat al-Ilahiyya,  Shah declared his conviction that unification of Hanafi and Shafi'i schools of law was essential for Indian Islamic revival. This was to be achieved through the legal re-evaluation of the madh'habs in the light of Qur'an and Hadith. Whatever rules not aligning with the Scriptures were to be discarded. Shah specifically sought the reformation of Hanafi jurisprudence and made its legal rulings confirm to authentic hadiths collected by the early hadith scholars, thus implementing his vision of reducing legal differences between madhabs. Waliullah's re-evaluation efforts led him to declare that Shafi'i school was the closest to the Sunnah. Thus, most of his legal positions aligned with the views of Imam Al-Shafi'i. Shah Waliullah sought the reconciliation of differences of Shafi'i and Hanafi schools of Fiqh as his duty. He was particularly concerned the pervasive Hanafi fanaticism prevalent in his community, which he rebuked, and called for an inclusive synthesis of all of the schools of law.

On Tafsir (Qur'anic exegesis) 
Shah Waliullah placed emphasize on a direct understanding of the Qur'an, maintaining that those students with sufficient knowledge must work with the text, rather than previous commentaries. He argued that Qurʾān is clear to any student with sufficient knowledge of Arabic, just like it was understandable to its first recipients and scholars, including those parts that are mutashābih (unclear). Shah believed that one should prefer the interpretation that is closest to the literal meaning (ẓāhir al-maʿnā) of the Qurʾān and the Sunnah which fits the Qur'anic context, without clinging to a particular school in exegesis, grammar, or theology.

On Taqlid 
Shah Waliullah said regarding the practice of Taqlid in Hujjatullahil Baalighah :  "There are numerous benefits in it that are no secret to anyone. These are especially required in these days when people lack courage, when carnal passions have taken deep root in people's souls and whenever a person is obsessed only with his opinion." 

He also said:  "The entire Ummah, or rather those of them who are dependable, are unanimous about the fact that it is permissible to follow one of these four Madhahib that have been methodically systemized and recorded. This unanimity remains to this day."

On Divine Attributes 
On the nature of Divine Attributes, Shah Waliullah rejected the Ash'ari view and followed the creed of early Ahl al-Hadith school. Criticising the extremists amongst the speculative theologians (Mutakallimoon) and supporting the Ahl al-Hadith, Shah writes in Hujjatullah al- Balighah: "Those speculators behaved contemptuously towards the people of Hadith calling them corporealists and anthropomorphists saying that they sought refuge in the formula of 'without asking how ( bi-la kaif )... this contempt of theirs is unfounded and .. they err in their sayings both from the viewpoint of tradition and of reason and.. they err in slandering the leaders of the true religion."

Shah had been a firm defender of the positions of Taqi ad-Din Ibn Taymiyya, the classical theologian who was a fierce critique of speculative theology and medieval clerical institutions. Shah would compose a treatise to defend Ibn Taymiyya, praising him as a great scholar of Sunni Islam.

Explaining his beliefs, Shah writes in Hujjat Allah al-Baligha:"Al-Tirmidhi said concerning the Hadith "The hand of God is full," that the religious leaders had said concerning this hadith that they believed it as it was given without interpreting or making conjectures about it. Likewise, more than one Imam, among them Sufyan al-Thauri, Malik ibn Anas, lbn 'Uyayna, and Ibn al-Mubarak, said that these things have been transmitted (in the hadith) and they believed them, and there was no scope for asking "how".... The earlier pious were unanimous in believing in Allah's Attributes according to His Wish and as He obligated it (to the men) to declare Him as dissimilar with the creatures by His verse, " Nothing is like Him."' And whoever obligates the opposite thought he contradicts the way of earlier pious. I say that there is no difference among the hearing, seeing, having power, laughing, speaking and Istiwa (existing upon the 'Arsh)."

Stance on Marathas 
His dislike of Marathas is expressed in one of his dreams that he narrated in “Fuyooz-ul Haramain”:

“I saw myself in a dream that I am Qaem al-Zaman (master of the age). Which means that when God Almighty wanted to establish a system of goodness and benevolence, then He made me a tool and medium for the fulfillment of this noble cause. And I saw that the king of the infidels took over the land of the Muslims and looted their property. He enslaved their women and children and in the city of Ajmer he declared the rites of disbelief. He eradicated the rites of Islam. Then after that I saw that the Almighty became angry and very angry with the people of the earth. And I witnessed the embodiment of the wrath of the Almighty in the heavens. And then dripping from there, divine wrath descended on me. Then I found myself angry. And this wrath which was filled in me, was blown into me by Almighty. Then I proceeded towards a city, destroying it and killing its inhabitants. other people followed me. Thus, destroying one city after another, we finally reached Ajmer. And there we killed the disbelievers. Then I saw the king of the infidels walking with the king of Islam, surrounded by a group of Muslims. In the meantime, the king of Islam ordered the king of the infidels to be slaughtered. People grabbed him and slaughtered him with knives. When I saw blood gushing out of the veins of his neck, I said: now blessing has descended”.

On the Shi'a 
In one of his letters available in manuscripts collection at Rampur, he asks Muslim rulers led by Ahmad Shah Bahadur to put a ban on public religious ceremonies by non-Muslims and to issue strict orders against certain ceremonies by the Shi'a: "Strict orders should be issued in all Islamic towns forbidding religious ceremonies publicly practiced by non-Muslims (such as the performance of Holi and ritual bathing in the Ganges). On the tenth of Muharram, Shi'a should not be allowed to go beyond the bounds of moderation, neither should they say or do things that are considered offensive by other Muslims (that is, recite tabarra, or curse the first three successors of the Prophet Muhammad) in the streets or bazars.

Arab Pre-Eminence 
Shah Waliullah strongly advocated against adopting non-Islamic customs, and argued for commitment to Arabic Islamic culture. Shah Waliullah believed that: “Muslims, no matter where they live, wherever they spend their youthful days, they should in any case be completely separated from the natives of that country in their culture, traditions and mannerisms. And wherever they are, they must be immersed in their Arabic splendor and Arabic trends”. On adherence to Arab culture, he insists: “Beware! The rich intend to adopt the ways of strangers and non-Arabs and those who deviate from the right path, and tries to mix and be like them”.

Works
Hujjat Allah al-Balighah (The Conclusive Argument of God), Lahore: Shaikh Ghulam Ali and Sons, 1979. Considered to be his most important work. First published in Bareilly, India in 1286 Hijri. This book explains how Islam is found suitable for all races, cultures, and people of the world and how successfully it solves social, moral, economic and political problems of human beings.
 (The Sacred knowledge), ed. D. Pendlebury, trans. G. Jalbani, The Sacred Knowledge, London: Octagon, 1982.
Al-Khayr al-kathir (The Abundant Good), trans. G. Jalbani, Lahore: Ashraf, 1974.
Sata'at (Manifestations), trans. into Urdu by S.M. Hashimi, Lahore: Idarah Thaqafat Islamiyya, 1989; trans. into English by G. Jalbani, Sufism and the Islamic Tradition: the Lamahat and Sata'at of Shah Waliullah, London.
Lamahat (Flashes of Lightning), Hyderabad: Shah Wali Allah Academy, 1963; trans. G. Jalbani, Sufism and the Islamic Tradition: the Lamahat and Sata'at of Shah Waliullah, London, 1980. (One of the important writings on Sufism.)
Fuyud al-haramayn (Emanations or Spiritual Visions of Mecca and Medina). 
Al-Tafhimat (Instructions or Clear Understanding), Dabhail, 1936, 2 vols. (One of the most comprehensive metaphysical works.)
Al-Budur al-bazighah (The Full Moons Rising in Splendour).
Ta’wil al-ahadith fi rumuz qisas al-anbiya (Symbolic Interpretation of the Events in the Mysteries of Prophetic Tales) 

Besides these, he is also credited being the first to translate the Quran into Persian in the Indian subcontinent.

Shah Waliullah worked hard to ensure that he was a role model for other Muslims. His deep understanding of the Qur'an, Hadith, Fiqh, and Tasawwuf made him a highly knowledgeable scholar at an early age.

Since he believed that an emphasis on the Qur'anic teachings was made vital to Muslims, he translated Arabic Qur'an into Persian. Few Muslims spoke Arabic and so the Qur'an had not been widely studied previously. Some Ulama criticized Shah Waliullah, but his work proved very popular. In addition to translating the Quran, Shah Waliullah wrote 51 books in Persian and Arabic.{} Amongst the most famous were Hujjat Allah al-Baligha and Izalah al Khifa.

He felt a debt to the Sufis for spreading Islam throughout India. He also appreciated Sufi spirituality. Waliullah built a bridge between Sufis and the Ulama (Islamic scholars).

References

External links

Shaykh al-Islāms
Asharis
Hanafis
Muslim reformers
Mujaddid
Islamic philosophers
18th-century Muslim theologians
Hadith scholars
Sunni Sufis
Sunni imams
Sunni Muslim scholars of Islam
1703 births
1762 deaths
18th-century Indian Muslims
18th-century Indian non-fiction writers
18th-century Indian educators
18th-century Indian biographers
18th-century Indian philosophers
18th-century Indian historians
18th-century Indian scholars
18th-century Indian translators
Burials at Mehdiyan